The Zamorano Eighty is a list of books intended to represent the most significant early volumes published on the history of California.  It was compiled in 1945 by members of the Zamorano Club, a Los Angeles-based group of bibliophiles.  Collecting first editions of every volume on the list has become the goal of a number of book collectors, though to date only four people have completed the task.

The Zamorano Club was founded in 1928 and named for Agustín Vicente Zamorano, the first printer in California.  A series of committees of Club members, including former American Smelting and Refining Company executive Henry Raup Wagner and bibliographer Robert Cowan, assembled a list of a hundred books, eventually whittled down to eighty.  During this process, Cowan died, and his Bibliography of the History of California and the Pacific West was added to the list as a tribute.

The list contains significant works by a number of well-known authors like Mark Twain, John Muir, Bret Harte, and Robert Louis Stevenson, as well as obscure texts concerning geographical exploration and legal matters.  Some of the works exist in very few, highly sought after copies, while others were quite common and not particularly valuable, until interest in the list caused their prices to rise.  Book dealers often refer to items for sale using their "Zamorano number" or have special sections dedicated to items on the list.

Thomas Streeter was the first collector to assemble a complete collection of first editions of every item on the list.  His collection was auctioned between 1966 and 1969.  Businessman Frederick William Beinecke was the second.  Retired investment counselor Henry H. Clifford completed his collection in 1988 and his collection was auctioned in 1995.  The fourth was architect Daniel Volkmann, who completed his collection in 1994, and it was auctioned in 2003.  Many other collectors have pursued this goal, including notorious bibliomane and book thief Stephen Blumberg.

Only one institution, the Beinecke Rare Book and Manuscript Library at Yale University, possesses a complete collection of the Zamorano 80, donated by Frederick W. Beinecke.  Both the Bancroft Library at the University of California, Berkeley and the Huntington Library in San Marino, California possess all but one of the volumes.

The rarest book on the list is number 64, the dime novel The Life and Adventures of Joaquín Murieta by John Rollin Ridge writing as "Yellow Bird".  Only two first-edition copies are known to exist, each used twice to complete the list.  It may be on the list only because Wagner owned a copy, which he sold to Streeter.  When Streeter's collection was being periodically auctioned, the auction of this copy was moved up over a year so the elderly Beinecke would be able to complete his Zamorano collection.  This copy is now in the Beinecke Library with the rest of Beinecke's Zamorano books.  Clifford purchased the second copy from a collector in Maine, which in turn was purchased by Volkmann at the auction of Clifford's collection.  The book has been described with terms like "Holy Grail" and "rara avis" and is highly desired by collectors.  Blumberg wanted it so much he and his accomplices planned and researched a potential burglary of Clifford's house when that collector owned the book.

The Zamorano Eighty

The works on the list are numbered in alphabetical order by author (or title, in the case of numbers 14, 35, and 62) and were not intended to be any sort of ranking of literary or financial value.

References

External links
 The Zamorano Club
 Zamorano 80 – Dorothy Sloan Books (extensive website for the Volkmann auction)

Lists of books
1945 documents
Historiography of California
Books about California
California-related lists
Book collecting